If You Wait is the debut studio album by English indie pop band London Grammar, released on 6 September 2013 by Metal & Dust Recordings and Ministry of Sound. Seven singles were released from the album: "Metal & Dust", "Wasting My Young Years", "Strong", "Nightcall", "Hey Now", "Sights" and "If You Wait". The album debuted at number two on the UK Albums Chart with first-week sales of 33,130 copies.

Background
After signing with Ministry of Sound and Big Life Management, the band began the first sessions of the album in early 2012 with Cam Blackwood. Later that year he was replaced by Tim Bran and Roy Kerr. Hannah Reid commented on the collaboration, saying, "Tim is amazing at recording, of finding the best way of recording a guitar or my vocal. Roy had the strongest relationship with Dot and they worked on production together."

The album's lyrics are mainly based upon vocalist Hannah Reid's personal life, in particular her troubled teenage years, prompting The Guardian to suggest that this was "the first quarter-life-crisis album."

Critical reception

If You Wait received generally positive reviews from music critics. At Metacritic, which assigns a normalised rating out of 100 to reviews from mainstream publications, the album received an average score of 75, based on 19 reviews.

Andy Gill of The Independent summarised the album's production and instrumentation as "all beautifully sketched to evoke the crepuscular intimacies of the songs."

A large quantity of praise went to the vocal ability of Reid, whose husky contralto vocals have been described as "defining and soulful" by Clash magazine and "emotive" and "folky" by Drowned in Sound. Her voice has been compared to artists like Florence Welch of Florence and the Machine, Annie Lennox, and Julee Cruise. Benji Taylor of Pretty Much Amazing wrote a favourable review of the album, calling it "an enthralling, stunning, deeply emotive album that perfectly marries understated electronica to sublime vocals and melodies." Vocalist Hannah Reid's voice was particularly praised: "underscored by an enduring brittle beauty and an underlying otherworldliness, as if she honed her craft singing amidst the gardens of Lothlorien, or some far-flung corner of Westeros."

Commercial performance
If You Wait entered the UK Albums Chart at number two, selling 33,130 copies in its first week. As of June 2017, it had sold 642,301 copies in the United Kingdom. In the United States, the album debuted at number 91 on the Billboard 200 with 4,000 copies sold.

Track listing
All tracks produced by Tim Bran, Roy Kerr and London Grammar, except where noted.

Notes
  signifies a co-producer

Personnel
Credits adapted from the liner notes of If You Wait.

London Grammar
 Hannah Reid
 Daniel Rothman
 Dot Major

Additional musicians

 Tim Bran – additional programming ; additional keyboards 
 Roy Kerr – additional programming
 Dot Major – additional programming 
 Wil Malone – string arrangements, string conducting 
 Tony Stanton – strings preparation 
 City of Prague Philharmonic Orchestra – strings

Technical

 Tim Bran – production
 Roy Kerr – production
 London Grammar – production
 Manon Grandjean – engineering
 Ben Siegal – engineering ; vocal recording, piano recording 
 Jan Holzner – string recording 
 James Fitzpatrick – orchestra contractor 
 Kevin "KD" Davis – mixing
 Tom Coyne – mastering

Artwork
 Mat Maitland – art direction
 Markus Karlsson – art direction
 Lee Kirby – photography

Charts

Weekly charts

Year-end charts

Decade-end charts

Certifications

Release history

Notes

References

2013 debut albums
Albums produced by Emile Haynie
Albums produced by Guy-Manuel de Homem-Christo
Columbia Records albums
London Grammar albums
Ministry of Sound albums